Sebastian Suhl (born 1969) is an American fashion industry executive and former CEO of Marc Jacobs International.

Suhl was the key player of sexual harassment and discrimination case of Prada Group, Prada Female Discrimination Case, the first women’s rights case of fashion industry counter reported to the Office of the United Nations High Commissioner for Human Rights and the first case for #Me Too movement of the fashion industry.

Education
Suhl earned a bachelor's degree in Political Science and Economics from Colorado College in 1989 and a Masters in Business Administration from ESADE in 1992.

Career
Suhl began his career in 1992 as a senior auditor with Deloitte & Touche in Barcelona. In 1996 he moved to Paris to take a managerial position with consulting firm Solving International.

Suhl entered the Fashion Industry in 1997 as Managing Director at Thiminster, followed by his role as Director of Business Development for Courreges, beginning in 1999.

Prada
Suhl joined Prada in 2001 as General Manager of France. In 2005 he was promoted to CEO in the Asia-Pacific region, where he spearheaded the Italian firm's retail expansion. In September 2009 he became Chief Operating Officer of Prada Group, heading the retail, wholesale, e-commerce and marketing departments for Prada, Miu Miu and Car Shoe brands. In 2011 Suhl launched Prada's IPO in Hong Kong where the luxury goods group raised $2.1 billion. Suhl was also instrumental for Prada's expansion into the U.S., Ukraine, Russia and UAE.

In 2009, Rina Bovrisse, an executive at Prada Japan K.K. contacted Suhl a Global COO at Prada Group in Milan urging to protect her female employees from sexual harassment and illegal sales by forcing her staff to buy Prada products. The Prada Japan K.K. CEO, Davide Sesia and human resources manager, Hiroyuki Takahashi were threatening female staff to purchase Prada products and enter the sales as customers on a regular basis to boost up the sales in Tokyo for IPO approval in Hong Kong. Suhl asked Bovrisse to send him the evidence of sexual harassment and illegal sales. Right after Bovrisse sent the evidence, Suhl forced Bovrisse to resign. Bovrisse took the case to the Tokyo court. Suhl countersued Bovrisse from his Prada logo registration subsidiary, Prada Luxembourg SA, for “damaging Prada’s logo.” In Japan, sexual harassment is not illegal at workplace. The Tokyo court ruled in Prada's favor with the reason “well-compensated women should absorb this level of harassment.” This let the UN Office of the High Commissioner for Human Rights to call for Japan's State party to introduce new regulations that would make sexual harassment in the workplace illegal.

Givenchy
In 2012 Suhl left Prada to become CEO of Givenchy. While there he opened 25 new boutiques while continuing to expand the brand's customer base in newly emerging markets in the East, including China and India.

Suhl's appointment was met with controversy. Asian Transnational Corporation Monitoring Network (ATNC), a network made of labour organizations from 12 Asian countries wrote a letter of concern to LVMH Group's Bernard Arnault as Suhl is involved in the discrimination case at Prada when the company "should proactively adopt measures to eliminate any forms of discrimination and fully observe the laws and regulations regarding labour rights, social justice and equal opportunities".

Marc Jacobs 
In July 2014 LVMH appointed Suhl CEO of Marc Jacobs International. He was replaced in July 2017.

Valentino

He is since November 2017 managing Valentino's development of international sales.

References

Living people
Colorado College alumni
American chief executives of fashion industry companies
Directors of LVMH
1969 births